(born March 1, 1968, as Jens Olaf Christian Nölke) is a German-born Zen monk who was the abbot of Antai-ji, a Japanese Sōtō Zen temple in Shin'onsen in the Mikata District of Japan's Hyōgo Prefecture from 2002 until 2020. He has translated works of Dōgen and Kōdō Sawaki, and has authored five books in German and sixteen books in Japanese.

Biography
At age 16, Muhō was introduced to zazen by one of his high school teachers and soon had the wish to become a Zen monk. To prepare for his stay in Japan, he studied Japanese at the Free University of Berlin, along with philosophy and physics. During his studies, he spent one year at Kyoto University and learned for the first time about Antai-ji. At age 22, he spent six months there as a lay practitioner.

Three years later, after graduating from university, Muhō was ordained as a Sōtō Zen monk under the abbot Miyaura Shinyu Rōshi. Apart from Antai-ji, he has trained for one year at the Rinzai monastery Tōfuku-ji in Kyoto, and one year at Hosshin-ji in Obama, Fukui.

After obtaining the transmission of dharma (shihō) from his teacher Miyaura Rōshi, Muhō decided to live as a homeless monk in a park in central Osaka, where he led a zazen group in 2001. Six months later, in February 2002, he learned of the sudden death of his teacher and was called back to Antai-ji. He succeeded his teacher as the ninth abbot in the spring of that year. In 2020 he retired after 18 years as the abbot and appointed Ekō, a Japanese nun, as his successor. Since he retired as abbot, Muho spends most of his time in Osaka, where he leads a Zen group that meets every Sunday in Osaka castle park (except when it is raining).

Muhō has published numerous books and translations in both Japanese and German. He has also featured in several films, including documentaries by director Takeshi Kitano and broadcaster Peter Barakan's "Begin Japanology", as well as Werner Penzel's feature film "Zen for Nothing".

Bibliography

German
 Zazen oder der Weg zum Glück. Rowohlt, 2007, .
 Ein Regentropfen kehrt ins Meer zurück. Berlin-Verlag, 2016, .
 Futter für Pferd und Esel: Das Dôgen-Lesebuch. Angkor-Verlag, 2018, .
 Das Meer weist keinen Fluss zurück. Berlin-Verlag, 2018, .
 Der Mond leuchtet in jeder Pfütze. Berlin-Verlag, 2020, .

Japanese
 Mayoeru mono no Zen shugyou. Shincho-shinsho, 2011, .
 Hadaka no Bousama. Sanga, 2012, .
 Tada suwaru. Kobunsha-shinsho, 2012, .
 Ikiru hint 33. Asahi-shinsho, 2012, .
 Otona ni naru tame no yatsu no shugyou. Shodensha, 2013, 
 Mayoinagara ikiru. Daiwa-shobo, 2013, 
 Dogen wo gyakuyunyu. Sanga, 2013, 
 Nihonjin ni shukyo ha iranai. Best-shinsho, 2014, 
 Yomu dake Zen shugyou. Asahi-shinbun-shuppan, 2014, 
 Mayoi ha satori no dai-ippo.　Shincho-shinsho, 2015, 
 Ari no mama demo ii, ari no mama de nakute mo ii.　Best-shinsho, 2015, 
 Kokoro ni hibiku Bukkyou no kingen 100.　Takarajima-sha, 2015, 
 Naze nihonjin ha gosenzo-sama ni inoru no ka.　Gentousha-shinsho, 2015, 
 Bukkyou no tsumetasa, Kirisutokyou no ayausa.　Best-shinsho, 2016, 
 Magenai Doitsujin, kimenai Nihonjin.　Sanga, 2016, 
 Kyou wo shinu koto de, ashita wo ikiru.　Best-shinsho, 2017,

Translations in English 

 Kōdō Sawaki: To You: Collected Sayings of Kodo Sawaki (co-translated by Jesse Reiho Haasch). Hohm Press 2021.

Translations in German 

 Kōdō Sawaki: Tag für Tag ein guter Tag. Angkor 2008. 
 Kōdō Sawaki: An dich. Zen-Sprüche. Angkor 2005. 
 Kōdō Sawaki: Zen ist die größte Lüge aller Zeiten. Angkor 2005. 
 Kōshō Uchiyama: Die Zen-Lehre des Landstreichers Kodo. Angkor 2007, übersetzt gemeinsam mit Guido Keller 
 Hitoshi Nagai: Penetre & ich: Philosophie für ein glückliches Leben. Berlin-Verlag 2021

References

External links
 
no direction Muho's blog
 
 Information about Muhō Nölke at Antaiji homepage
 "A German Zen Master" Interview by Japan National Tourism Organization
 "Happy and hard" Interview by Maymagazine.eu
 

Soto Zen Buddhists
Zen Buddhist abbots
German Zen Buddhists
1968 births
Living people
German Buddhists